XO-3 was a design for a tablet/e-book reader intended to be developed under the One Laptop per Child (OLPC) initiative, but the project was cancelled in November 2012, replaced by the XO tablet.

History
It was planned to have a tablet computer form factor over the canceled dual-screen design concept of the XO-2. The inner workings were those of the XO 1.75 together with the same ARM processor.

The XO-3 featured an 8-inch 4:3 1024 × 768-resolution display and used a Marvell Technology Group Marvell Armada PXA618 SoC. The XO-3 was intended to feature innovative charging options such as a hand crank or a solar panel.

The XO-3 tablet was planned to be released in 2012, for a target price below $100. The XO-3 and accompanying solar cell & handcrank power options were demoed at the International Consumer Electronics Show (CES) in January, 2012 as shown on BBC News technology programme Click.

References

External links

 OLPC article about the XO-3

One Laptop per Child
Tablet computers
Linux-based devices